Bearinger Township is a civil township of Presque Isle County in the U.S. state of Michigan.  As of the 2010 census, the township population was 369.

Geography

Demographics
As of the census of 2010, there were 369 people, 177 households, and 127 families residing in the township.  The population density was 6.0 per square mile (2.1/km2).  There were 555 housing units at an average density of 9.02 per square mile (3.2/km2).  The racial makeup of the township was 97.6% White, 0.01% Native American, 0.0% Asian, 0.01% from other races, and 0.002% from two or more races. Hispanic or Latino of any race were 1.08% of the population.

There were 177 households, out of which 21.0% had children under the age of 18 living with them, 64.4% were married couples living together, 5.6% had a female householder with no husband present, and 30.0% were non-families. 28.2% of all households were made up of individuals, and 12.7% had someone living alone who was 65 years of age or older.  The average household size was 2.08 and the average family size was 2.44.

In the township the population was spread out, with 18.2% under the age of 18, 3.3% from 18 to 24, 14.4% from 25 to 44, 38.5% from 45 to 64, and 28.9% who were 65 years of age or older.  The median age was 58.4 years. For every 100 females, there were 100.6 males.  For every 100 females age 18 and over, there were 105.8 males.

The median income for a household in the township was $45,000, and the median income for a family was $48,125. Males had a median income of $35,500 versus $25,625 for females. The per capita income for the township was $21,195.  About 7.0% of families and 10.9% of the population were below the poverty line, including 0.0% of those under age 18 and 6.0% of those age 65 or over.

References

Townships in Presque Isle County, Michigan
Townships in Michigan
Populated places on Lake Huron in the United States